The 2015–16 NBL Canada season was the fifth season of the National Basketball League of Canada (NBLC). The regular season began on December 26, 2015 and concluded on April 30, 2016. There were 40 total games played by each team, eight more than the previous year. The new expansion Niagara River Lions team are competing in their first season. The Halifax Hurricanes also began play, replacing the defunct Halifax Rainmen. During the offseason, the Mississauga Power folded to make way for Raptors 905 of the NBA Development League. Prior to the season, the league also enforced new policies to help improve its standard, including rules regarding sportsmanship, addressing the brawl that ended the 2015 NBL Canada Finals. The first regular season game featured the Island Storm and the Saint John Mill Rats.

Transactions

Coaching changes 

 On May 7, 2015, the Saint John Mill Rats hired Rob Spon as head coach.
 On May 8, 2015, the NBL Canada suspended Windsor Express head coach Bill Jones for one season.
 On May 29, 2015, the NBL Canada hired Brampton A's head coach Dave Magley as league commissioner.
 On July 14, 2015, the Windsor Express hired Tony Jones as interim head coach, temporarily replacing  his brother, Bill.
 On July 29, 2015, the London Lightning fired head coach Carlos Knox after one year with the team.
 On August 19, 2015, the London Lightning hired Kyle Julius as head coach.
 On February 12, 2016, the Moncton Miracles hired Paul Mokeski to replace Serge Langis.

Preseason

Out-of-league 
On October 23, 2015, Raptors 905 of the NBA D-League, who replaced the Mississauga Power earlier in the offseason, announced that they would be facing two NBL Canada teams—the Windsor Express and London Lightning—in their three-game preseason schedule. The team would visit the WFCU Centre to face the Express on the road and compete with the Lightning at their home arena, the Hershey Centre. On November 5, Raptors 905 defeated the Express, 117–114. Adrian Moss, who scored 38 points, helped Windsor make a comeback after facing an 18-point deficit at halftime. Raptors 905 picked up another win over the Lightning on November 9, after pulling off a 126–111 victory. Tyshawn Patterson, a draft combine addition, led London with 26 points. The Windsor Express played another preseason game against the Lima Express of the Midwest Professional Basketball Association (MPBA) on December 13 at the St. Clair College SportsPlex in Windsor, pulling off the 108–82 win. Maurice Bolden led Windsor with 24 points while Lima's Jody Hill put up a game-high 26 points.

In-league 
On December 18, 2015, the Halifax Hurricanes and Island Storm competed in a preseason game at Centre 200 in Sydney, Nova Scotia, with the Hurricanes winning, 106–103. Centre 200 is expected to be the home of the future NBL Canada team, the Cape Breton Highlanders. On December 19, the London Lightning defeated the Windsor Express, 97–87, behind 19 points from Chad Posthumus and Stephen Maxwell. The Hurricanes also won their second preseason contest over the Moncton Miracles, that same day, pulling away for a 110–91 victory. On December 21, the Miracles defeated the Storm, 115–110, in a fundraising game at Crandall University. Moncton's James Justice led all scorers with 27 points. On December 23, the Saint John Mill Rats defeated the Miracles, 128–110, behind 33 points from Doug Herring, Jr. They set a franchise record for most fans at the Harbour Station, with an attendance of 6,646.

Regular season

Standings

Statistics
As of February 24, 2016.

Individual statistic leaders

Individual game highs

Team statistic leaders

Attendance

Awards

Players of the Week

Playoffs

Notable occurrences

Offseason 

 The league established a team from St. Catharines, Ontario called the Niagara River Lions. They begin play at the Meridian Centre as a member of the Central Division.
 The NBL Canada unanimously hired Brampton A's head coach and general manager Dave Magley as commissioner, succeeding Paul Riley.
 The Mississauga Power franchise folded with the creation of Raptors 905, a D-League affiliate to the Toronto Raptors of the NBA. Maple Leaf Sports & Entertainment (MLSE) acquired the team's rights.
 The Halifax Rainmen filed for bankruptcy in the fallout of the 2015 NBL Canada Finals brawl. The franchise later gets new ownership and is rebranded as the Halifax Hurricanes.
 The Brampton A's relocated from Brampton to Orangeville, Ontario. Their home arena changed from the Powerade Centre to the Athlete Institute. They were also renamed the Orangeville A's.
 The league announced the Cape Breton Highlanders, a new expansion team from Sydney, Nova Scotia, who were expected to operate in the 2015–16 season in the Atlantic Division. However they later announced they would not join until the 2016–17 season.
 The Saint John Mill Rats unveiled a new logo, slightly resembling their previous one, and an official slogan "Building Amazing Now".
 The Mill Rats signed two former NBL Canada Most Valuable Players in Anthony Anderson and Gabe Freeman in a key offseason acquisition.
 The league's Board of Governors approved of a stricter drug policy, a dress code, and created rules to promote sportsmanship.
 The defending champions Windsor Express got new members from a private local partner to add to its ownership.
 The Mill Rats set a franchise record with an attendance of 6,646 in a preseason game vs the Moncton Miracles on December 23, 2015.
 Doug Herring, Jr. of the Mill Rats and Logan Stutz of the River Lions become the first co-Players of the Week on December 27, 2015.

References 

 
National Basketball League of Canada seasons
NBL